Rourkela Jagdalpur Express is a daily express train which runs between Jagdalpur and Rourkela. It is operated by the South Eastern Railway Zone of Indian Railways.

Coaches
The 18107 / 08 Rourkela Junction - Jagdalpur Express has one 3 AC,  three Sleeper Coaches, 5 general unreserved & two SLR (seating with luggage rake) coaches . It does not carry a pantry car coach.

As is customary with most train services in India, coach composition may be amended at the discretion of Indian Railways depending on demand.

Service
Currently this train services has been extended to Jagdalpur (Chhattisgarh). As of now the extension date has not yet been confirmed.

Routing

Traction
As the route is  electrified, a WAM-4 from TATA shed is its link but earlier an WDM-3D diesel locomotive pulled the train to its destination.

References

Transport in Rourkela
Transport in Jagdalpur
Rail transport in Odisha
Express trains in India